The Andraus Building is a well-known building in the República area of downtown São Paulo, Brazil, on the corner of São João Avenue and Pedro Américo Street. It is 115 metres tall and has 32 floors, and its construction ended in 1962. On 24 February 1972, the building suffered a great fire which caused the deaths of 16 persons trapped inside the building. 330 others were also injured. The building was renovated after the fire, and currently houses municipal and federal government offices.

Fire 
A possible cause of the fire would have been an electrical system overload. The fire occurred at 16:15PM on Thursday, 24 February 1972, on the second floor and consumed the entire building, which contained several corporate offices, among them German multinational companies Henkel and Siemens. Since restoration, the building has housed public offices and is known as the Pirani Building, after a former department store that used to occupy the lower floors before the fire.

Although the building is most often associated with the fatal fire, it nevertheless has significant architectural value, being one of the best-known skyscrapers of São Paulo, of considerable prominence in the skyline with its unmistakable geometric shape.

Victims 
Among the fatalities were two executives at Henkel: Paul Jürgen Pondorf, President of the company, and Ottmar Flick. The corporate offices were a total loss. Most survivors of the tragedy, unable to use the emergency stairs, chose to climb to the top floor of the building, where they remained until firefighters were able to get the fire under control. Many were later rescued via helicopter by the pilot Olendino de Souza. The fire had burned out at 23:00PM.

Consequences 
The fire was covered live on television broadcasts and the scenes of people throwing themselves from the windows shocked the world. This sparked discussions about fire safety regulations for high-rise buildings, an aspect largely neglected until then. These discussions gained added impetus from an even greater tragedy, the fire at the Joelma Building, which occurred two years later in São Paulo.

In 2013, the newspaper Folha de S.Paulo reported that the fire safety measures in Andraus still were substandard.

See also
Joelma Building
Skyscraper fire

External links
Emporis: Andraus

References

Central Zone of São Paulo
Skyscrapers in São Paulo
Office buildings completed in 1962
Skyscraper office buildings in Brazil
1972 fires in South America